Ben Jones (April 2, 1903 Schlater, Mississippi – December 23, 1938 Uniontown, Alabama) was an American racecar driver.

Career statistics

By season

Indy 500 results

References

External links
 

Indianapolis 500 drivers
1903 births
1938 deaths
People from Leflore County, Mississippi
Racing drivers from Mississippi